Big Brother is a reality show based on the Big Brother series by Endemol. The show originates from the Netherlands, where in 1999 the first season was aired.

At present, the format is spread in a number of countries around the world. A group of people (called the Housemates) live together in an isolated house. 24 hours a day their life is recorded by hidden cameras in all the rooms in the House. They do not have TV, Internet, newspapers, even watches on their wrists. The Housemates are completely isolated from the outside world. Every week, each one of them must enter the Diary room and nominate two of the other people for public eviction. The two or more housemates with most negative votes become nominated. For almost a week the TV viewers have to decide which of them to be evicted, voting via SMS or phone calls. Every week the Housemates have a week task. Depending on whether they perform their task successfully or unsuccessfully, their week budget is increased or decreased. During the final week, the viewers vote which one of the remaining people in the House to be the winner, who receives a large cash prize.

The show's name comes from George Orwell's 1948 novel Nineteen Eighty-Four, a dystopia in which Big Brother is the all-seeing, omnipotent leader of Oceania.

In Bulgaria, the first season of Big Brother was aired in 2004 on Nova Television, and quickly became one of the most successful TV formats in the country. Niki Kanchev was the main presenter in all editions, except for Big Brother 4, where he was replaced by Milen Tsvetkov. Evelina Pavlova was a co-host in the period 2004–2006. Five main seasons, ten celebrity seasons, four All Stars seasons, two Most Wanted seasons and a Family season have been produced so far. The fifth main season premiered on 17 August 2015 and was the first non-celebrity season to be produced in seven years.

Seasons

Big Brother

Big Brother Family

VIP Brother

Big Brother All Stars & Most Wanted

Big Brother: The Housemates Strike Back 
On 7 June 2007, Big Brother brought former housemates from Big Brother and VIP Brother seasons together and gave them their last task — to destroy the House. Here are the housemates, who participated in the special edition of the show:

Trivia
 General
 Winners: 13 males, 7 females and 1 family
 Youngest Big Brother winner: Lyubov Stancheva (Big Brother 3) – 21
 Big Brother winner with the highest percentage: 78%, Konstantin, VIP Brother 1
 Highest eviction percentage: Elena Georgieva, 86%, Big Brother 2
 Least eviction difference: Lilana, 4%, VIP Brother 1
 Oldest Big Brother housemate: Radka and Chavdar Kamenarovi – 62 years old, Big Brother Family
 Season with most contestants: Big Brother 4, 26 housemates
 Season with fewest contestants: Big Brother All Stars 4, 8 housemates
 Shortest gap between 2 Big Brother seasons: 3 months, BB2 – VIP Brother 1
 Shortest Big Brother: Big Brother 5 – 26 days
 Longest Big Brother: Big Brother 1 and Big Brother 2 – 92 days
 Shortest stay in the House: Danail Panchev and Daniel Delchev, Big Brother 4, 4 days
 Big Brother with highest money-prize: Big Brother 4, 300 000 leva
 Most housemates to leave the house voluntarily: 4, VIP Brother 1
 Most housemates left on the final night: 7, VIP Brother 3
 Youngest Big Brother housemate: Vanesa Tsvetanova (Big Brother Family) – 17 years old
 VIP Brother with highest money-prize: VIP Brother 2, 100 000 leva (in the first season it was 50 000)
 Longest time spent in the House: 118 days, Zdravko Vasilev – Big Brother 1 and VIP Brother 2
 Contestant won twice: Georgi Tashev "Gino Biancalana" – VIP Brother 7 and Big Brother Most Wanted 1
 2004–2005 /Big Brother 1/
 First set of nominees: Anelia and Dimitar
 First contestant to be evicted: Anelia Ivanova
 First contestant to voluntarily leave: Dimitar Kazalov
 First replacement housemate: Tihomir Georgiev
 First Big Brother Winner: Zdravko Vassilev /200 000 leva/
 First contestants to be expelled by Big Brother: Nayden Naydenov and Svetlan Shevrov “Groshi”
 First sex in the House: Tihomir Georgiev and Mariela Kiselkova
 First lesbian sex: Mariela Kiselkova and Svetlozara Trendafilova
 Longest time spent in the house without being nominated: 70 days, Svetlozara Trendafilova
 First housemate not to be nominated during the whole season: Viktor
 2005 /Big Brother 2/
 First "evil" Big Brother
 First Big Brother with a couple competing: Elena and Miroslav
 First contestant to be voted into the house by the public: Elena Romele
 First foreigner housemate: Leonardo Bianchi (from Italy)
 Longest time spent in the house by a replacement housemate: Elena Romele
 2006 /VIP Brother 1/
 First set of nominees: Rayna, Mityo Pishtova and Vesela Neynska
 First VIP housemate to be evicted: Raina
 First VIP housemate to voluntarily leave: Vesela Neynska
 First VIP Brother Winner: Konstantin /50 000 levas/
 First child to enter and live in the House: Danaya (3 years old)
 First blood related housemates: Violeta and Danaya, mother and daughter
 Fewest housemates to be evicted: 2
 First Big Brother with secret inquisition: VIP Brother 1
 2006 /Big Brother 3/
 First season with a talk show: Big Brother's Big Mouth
 First triplets competing: Vyara, Nadezhda and Lyubov
 First pregnant housemate: Svetlana
 First Big Brother baby: Amber
 First faked eviction: Panayot and Mariola
 Longest time before the first eviction takes place: 29 days
 First nominations with 5 nominated housemates (Vyara, Nadezhda, Lilyana, Svetlana, Penyo): the sixth nominations
 First double eviction: Penyo and Nadezhda
 First non-secret nominations: the eighth nominations
 First nominations with positive votes: the ninth nominations
 First final with two people in fourth place: Lilyana and Paloma (they had equal votes)
 First woman to win: Lyubov
 2007 /VIP Brother 2/
 First housemates to compete in two Big Brother seasons: Zdravko and Tihomir, previously from Big Brother 1
 First TV show shot in the House during Big Brother: Hot with host Veneta Raykova (one of the Housemates)
 First family in the House: Zdravko, Hristina and Yanitsa
 First wedding in the House: Zdravko and Hristina
 First non-VIP on VIP Brother: Hristina
 First nominations when the Housemates can nominate themselves positively: the first nominations
 First nominations when the Housemates had to nominate three people: the second nominations
 First non-VIP to win VIP Brother: Hristina
 First intruder to win: Hristina
 2008 /Big Brother 4/
 First season to be shot in the new House
 First season without Niki Kanchev as a host
 2009 /VIP Brother 3/
 The longest VIP season of the show in Bulgaria – 56 Days.

External links
 Official site
 World of Big Brother
 Big Brother 1
 Big Brother 2
 Big Brother 3
 Big Brother 4
 Big Brother Family
 VIP Brother 1
 VIP Brother 2
 VIP Brother 3

 
Bulgarian television series
2004 Bulgarian television series debuts
Bulgarian reality television series
Bulgarian-language television shows
Nova (Bulgarian TV channel) original programming